The Power of Decision is a 1917 American silent drama film directed by John W. Noble and starring Frances Nelson, Richard Tucker and John Davidson.

Cast
 Frances Nelson as Margot 
 Richard Tucker as Austin Bland 
 John Davidson as Wood Harding 
 Sally Crute as Mrs. Wood Harding 
 Mary Asquith as Mrs. Hall 
 Fuller Mellish as The Old Artist 
 Hugh Jeffrey as The Butler

References

Bibliography
 Lowe, Denise. An Encyclopedic Dictionary of Women in Early American Films: 1895-1930. Routledge, 2014.

External links
 

1917 films
1917 drama films
1910s English-language films
American silent feature films
Silent American drama films
American black-and-white films
Films directed by John W. Noble
Metro Pictures films
1910s American films